is a district located in Saga Prefecture, Japan.

As of February 1, 2009 the district has an estimated population of 16,308 and a density of 371 persons per km2. The total area is 43.94 km2.

Municipalities
Yoshinogari, whose borders are effectively the same as Kanzaki District's.

History

Districts in Saga Prefecture